Annie Jeanne Francoise McKitrick (born 1952) is a Canadian politician who represented the electoral district of Sherwood Park in the Legislative Assembly of Alberta from 2015 to 2019.

Early life and career

McKitrick, born in France, came to Canada to attend McGill University, where she obtained a bachelor of science in ecology. McKitrick also has a master's degree in education and a diploma in public-sector management from the University of Victoria.

McKitrick worked as a researcher with a grant from the Canadian International Development Agency in Kyrgyzstan, as a co-ordinator for income generating projects in Thailand, and for a nongovernmental organization responsible for refugee and community development programs in Southeast Asia.

From 1996 until 2005, McKitrick was a school trustee and chair of the Richmond school board in Richmond, British Columbia.

Provincial politics

McKitrick was elected to the Legislative Assembly of Alberta in the 2015 Alberta general election representing the electoral district of Sherwood Park. On October 17, 2017 she was sworn in as the Parliamentary Secretary to the Minister of Education. She was defeated in the 2019 Alberta general election.

Electoral history

2019 general election

2015 general election

References

Alberta New Democratic Party MLAs
Living people
1950s births
Women MLAs in Alberta
21st-century Canadian politicians
21st-century Canadian women politicians